The JPMorgan Emerging Market Bond Index (EMBI) are a set of three bond indices to track bonds in emerging markets operated by J P Morgan.  The indices are the Emerging Markets Bond Index Plus, the Emerging Markets Bond Index Global and the Emerging Markets Bond Global Diversified Index.

Emerging Markets Bond Index Plus
The Emerging Markets Bond Index Plus (EMBI+) tracks total returns for traded external debt instruments (external meaning foreign currency denominated fixed income) in the emerging markets. The regular EMBI index covers U.S.dollar-denominated Brady bonds, loans and Eurobonds. The EMBI+ expands upon J.P.Morgan's original Emerging Markets Bond Index (EMBI), which was introduced in 1992 and covered only Brady bonds.  An external debt version, the EMBI+ is the JPMorgan EMBI Global Index

In addition to serving as a benchmark, the EMBI+ provides investors with a definition of the market for emerging markets external-currency debt, a list of the instruments traded, and a compilation of their terms.

The index comprises a set of broker-traded debt instruments widely followed and quoted by several market makers. Instruments in the EMBI+ must have a minimum face value outstanding of $500 million and must meet strict criteria for secondary market trading liquidity.

Emerging Markets Bond Global Index
The J.P.Morgan Emerging Markets Bond Index Global ("EMBI Global") tracks total returns for traded external debt instruments in the emerging markets, and is an expanded version of the JPMorgan EMBI+. As with the EMBI+, the EMBI Global includes U.S.dollar-denominated Brady bonds, loans, and Eurobonds with an outstanding face value of at least $500 million. It covers more of the eligible instruments than the EMBI+ by relaxing somewhat the strict EMBI+ limits on secondary market trading liquidity.

Emerging Markets Bond Global Diversified Index
The EMBI Global Diversified limits the weights of those index countries with larger debt stocks by only including a specified portion of these countries eligible current face amounts of debt outstanding.

See also
JPMorgan GBI-EM Index
Emerging market debt
Bond market index

References

Bond market indices
Bonds (finance)
JPMorgan Chase